John W. Murphy (1874 – April 10, 1947) was an American lawyer and Democratic politician who served as the Attorney General of Arizona from 1923 to 1928.

Life and career 
Murphy was born in Edgar County, Illinois. He studied law and worked as a prosecutor. In 1904 he moved to Arizona territory, settled in Globe, and worked as the Gila County Attorney. Murphy was in the 1st Arizona State Legislature. He was elected Attorney General of Arizona in 1922 and re-elected in 1924 and 1926.

While attorney general, Murphy oversaw enforcement of the Indian Citizenship Act.

Death
On April 10, 1947, Murphy died at his sister's house in Paris, Illinois, when he was visiting.

References

External links
 State Bar of Arizona: Annual Report of the State Bar of Arizona, Band 11, Teil 1943, The Bar, 1950, S. 19
 "John W. Murphy," Arizona Republic, 11. April 1947
 1926 Image

Arizona Attorneys General
Arizona Democrats
1874 births
1947 deaths
District attorneys in Arizona